S.C.A.R.S. (standing for Super Computer Animal Racing Simulator, although unmentioned) is a racing video game developed by Vivid Image and published by Ubi Soft for PlayStation, Nintendo 64, and Microsoft Windows in 1998.

Development 
While working on the various ports of Street Racer, Vivid Image and Ubi Soft decided it would be a good idea to create a 3D racing game specifically for the next-gen consoles. Mev Dinc, who headed Vivid Image, developed a concept of cars based on wildcats and other animals, with tracks that reflected their natural habitats. Ubi Soft loved the idea, and provided some of their own graphics and sound design resources to help fill the otherwise strained team. Originally, the game was going to be called Vivid Racing. After some iterations, they instead decided on S.C.A.R.S.  As development progressed, the coders struggled with balancing the high level of detail and performance with the space limitations of the tracks. Courses needed to be shortened, and as a result, many of the technical turns and obstacles were condensed, creating a much more challenging experience than they had originally planned.

Reception

The game received average reviews on all platforms according to the review aggregation website GameRankings. Next Generation said of the PlayStation version in its December 1998 issue, "For all its faults, S.C.A.R.S. isn't terrible, and it is one of the few PlayStation games to allow four players to race in 3D on a split screen. If you have a Multitap, this is almost a worthy purchase. Without a Multitap, it's a colorful racer, but not much else." Two issues later, however, the magazine said of the Nintendo 64 version, "One of the best of the Mario Kart clones, S.C.A.R.S. does nearly everything right, surpassing both the graphics and the control of the PlayStation version. The game is challenging and addicting without ever annoying the player to the point of frustration. It supports up to four players via split screen and is a great way to kill time with friends."

Dr. Zombie of GamePro said of the PlayStation version in its November 1998 issue, "You shouldn't pass up S.C.A.R.S as just another kiddie Mario Kart-style racer – by taking a look under this hood, you'll find a lot of fun action." One issue later, he said of the Nintendo 64 version, "Mario Kart fans will find S.C.A.R.S similar but with a much harder edge. The game's action is fast and furious with enough variety in its tracks and weapons to warrant replay." Joel Strauch called the PC version "an easy-to-pick-up game that the kids'll love and adults will tolerate. It's missing the best part of Mario Kart-esque games—the battle mode—but you can't beat the price."

Notes

References

External links
 

1998 video games
Science fiction racing games
Multiplayer and single-player video games
Nintendo 64 games
PlayStation (console) games
Racing video games
Ubisoft games
Video games developed in the United Kingdom
Windows games